K. K. Rema (born 10 August 1970) is an activist-turned-politician associated with the Revolutionary Marxist Party of India. She is the widow of Revolutionary Marxist Party founder late T. P. Chandrasekharan. She has contested from Vadakara constituency in Kerala during the state assembly elections of 2021 and won with a margin of 7491 votes.

Personal life and education 
Rema was born in Naduvannur village of Kozhikode district in Kerala to K. K. Madhavan and Dakshayani Amma. She did her primary schooling from Kavumthara AUP School and completed pre-degree from Zamorin's Guruvayurappan College, Kozhikode. Subsequently, she earned B.A. in History degree from Malabar Christian College. She managed to complete the Junior Diploma in Cooperation (JDC) while being actively part of the communist movement. Her marriage to T. P. Chandrasekharan was arranged within the party outlook which took place on 16 October 1994. Later on, she joined the Badakara Cooperative Rural Bank and was serving as the branch manager while the state assembly polls of 2021 were due.

Political activism 
She served as the state vice president of SFI and was a state committee member in the 90s. Rema has been active in the local party activities in and around Vadakara, where she has been married till 2012. She has been a crusader against murder and rape Kerala and a strong voice in favor of women's rights in the last decade.

Her husband, T P Chandrasekharan was killed on 4 May 2012 for being a vocal critic and a fighting force against the CPI(M). Following her husband's martyrdom, she contested the Vadakara seat in the 2016 Kerala Legislative assembly election but she had to finish at third position with a vote share of more than 20000 votes. Considering the trend this is such a great margin in Kerala elections.

Meanwhile, RMP and different political organisations in other states came together and established the Revolutionary Marxist Party of India, which was registered with the election commission in 2017. In 2021, K K Rema faced the assembly elections from Vadakara constituency with the unconditional support extended by UDF and became the first MLA of RMPI. She is the first woman communist to win from the constituency. She is the sitting MLA from Vatakara Constituency in the 2021 Kerala Legislative Assembly election.

References

External links 
 വടകരയെക്കുറിച്ചുള്ള സ്വപ്നങ്ങൾ പങ്കുവെച്ച് കെ കെ രമ
 Point Blank (Interviews) 2014 – Asking the right questions – K K Rema (Part 1)
 Point Blank (Interviews) 2014 – Asking the right questions – K K Rema (Part 2)
 Interview with K K Rema | Nethavinoppam | 30 Oct 2015
 ടി പി ചന്ദ്രശേഖരൻ വധം വീണ്ടും ചർച്ചയാകുന്നു | ജനകീയ കോടതി | കെ.കെ രമ

Kerala MLAs 2021–2026
1970 births
Living people